Al Bateen Academy is a private, British curriculum school in Abu Dhabi, United Arab Emirates.  Al Bateen educates students from years 7-13. It is affiliated with Al Mushrif Primary school, which operates from the same building.

History
The Academy was opened in September 2011; the new facilities included an auditorium for performing arts, science labs, sports facilities, and a recording studio and fully equipped computer labs.

At first the school offered the British curriculum for years 7 - 9.  Later an GCSE and IGCSE examinations were added along with the International Baccalaureate Diploma Programme. Until 2018, the school also offered students International AS Levels which was a one year programme. Since 2018, however, this programme has been discontinued.

In 2016, Al Bateen Academy was the first school to be awarded 'Outstanding' status by ADEK.

Curriculum 

Al Bateen follows the British curriculum. The school offers IGCSEs, GCSEs and International Baccalaureate (IB) Science, English, Arabic, Islamic Studies (Or Citizenship), Physical Education and Mathematics are compulsory subjects throughout the entire school. Students begin their secondary school years in Key Stage 3 (Years 7, 8 and 9), following the National Curriculum of England and Wales, and then move into Key Stage 4 (Years 10 and 11). During KS4 they sit a range of UK national exams GCSE (General Certificate of Secondary Education) and IGCSE (International General Certificate of Secondary Education). If students achieve the required grades they can go onto IB which will take another two years.

Activities
Al Bateen students can participate in interschool volleyball.

References

External links 
Official Website

Schools in Abu Dhabi
2011 establishments in the United Arab Emirates